This article presents a list of the historical events and publications of Australian literature during 1963.

Major publications

Books 

 Jessica Anderson – An Ordinary Lunacy
 Jon Cleary – Forests of the Night
 Sumner Locke Elliott – Careful, He Might Hear You
 Catherine Gaskin – The Tilsit Inheritance
 Brian James – Hopeton High
 Barbara Jefferis – Wild Grapes
 Mungo MacCallum – Son of Mars
 Randolph Stow – Tourmaline
 Arthur Upfield – The Body at Madman's Bend
 Morris West – The Shoes of the Fisherman

Short stories 

 A. Bertram Chandler – Beyond the Galactic Rim
 Jon Cleary – Pillar of Salt and Other Stories
 Peter Cowan – "The Voice"
 Frank Hardy – Legends from Benson's Valley
 Shirley Hazzard
 Cliffs of Fall and Other Stories
 "The Picnic"
 Xavier Herbert – Larger Than Life : Twenty Short Stories
 Hal Porter
 "Gretel"
 "Young Woman in a Wimple"
 Colin Thiele – Favourite Australian Stories (edited)
 Patrick White
 "Clay"
 "Down at the Dump"
 "Miss Slattery and Her Demon Lover"

Children's and Young Adult fiction 

 Nan Chauncy – The Roaring 40
 L. H. Evers – Danny's Wonderful Uncle
 John Gunn – The Goodbye Island
 Eric Lambert – Dolphin
 Joan Phipson – Threat to the Barkers
 Eleanor Spence – The Green Laurel
 Colin Thiele – Storm Boy

Poetry 

 Bruce Dawe – "And a Good Friday Was Had By All"
 Gwen Harwood – "Suburban Sonnet"
 Dorothy Hewett - What About the People (with Merv Lilley)
 A. D. Hope
 "Crossing the Frontier"
 "A Letter from Rome"
 James McAuley – "Pieta"
 Ian Mudie – The North-Bound Rider
 Peter Porter – "Your Attention Please"
 Chris Wallace-Crabbe – In Light and Darkness
 Henry Kendall – Henry Kendall (edited by T. Inglis Moore)
 John Shaw Neilson – Shaw Neilson (edited by Judith Wright)
 Judith Wright – Five Senses : Selected Poems

Biography 

 Xavier Herbert – Disturbing Element
 Alan Marshall – In Mine Own Heart
 Hal Porter – The Watcher on the Cast-Iron Balcony

Non-fiction 

 Geoffrey Blainey – The Rush That Never Ended : A History of Australian Mining

Drama 

 Alan Hopgood – And the Big Men Fly
 Hal Porter – The Tower

Awards and honours

Literary

Children and Young Adult

Poetry

Births 

A list, ordered by date of birth (and, if the date is either unspecified or repeated, ordered alphabetically by surname) of births in 1963 of Australian literary figures, authors of written works or literature-related individuals follows, including year of death.

 19 July – Garth Nix, novelist
 30 September - Stan Grant, non-fiction writer and journalist
 8 October – Nick Earls, novelist

Unknown date
 Catherine Jinks, novelist
 John Kinsella, poet
 Mandy Sayer, novelist

Deaths 

A list, ordered by date of death (and, if the date is either unspecified or repeated, ordered alphabetically by surname) of deaths in 1963 of Australian literary figures, authors of written works or literature-related individuals follows, including year of birth.

 30 January – Will H. Ogilvie, poet (1869)
11 March – Deirdre Cash (Criena Rohan), Australian novelist (born 1924)
 24 July – Ruth Bedford, poet (born 1882)

See also 
 1963 in Australia
 1963 in poetry
 1963 in literature
List of years in Australian literature
 List of years in literature

References

 
Australian literature by year
20th-century Australian literature
1963 in literature